The Tornado outbreak of May 1968 was a significant and deadly tornado outbreak that struck most of the central and southern United States from May 15 to May 16, 1968. Producing 46 tornadoes, the outbreak killed at least 72 people, including 45 in Arkansas alone. The outbreak also produced two F5 tornadoes in Iowa. It was one of the deadliest tornado outbreaks in the United States since the 1960s and is one of the deadliest outbreaks in Iowa history.

Outbreak description

Severe weather activity started during the afternoon of May 15 as a low pressure system crossed the area. The first tornado touchdowns were across the Midwestern States including the two Iowa F5s that hit central and eastern parts of the state about 45 minutes apart during the late afternoon. Both tornadoes killed 18 in total. It affected the town of Charles City just before 5 PM destroying much of the area. Damage figures were pegged at $30 million in Charles City alone while $1.5 million of damage was recorded elsewhere. This tornado killed 13 and injured 462 others. The second F5 tornado affected Fayette County and damaged or destroyed nearly 1000 homes. The hardest hit areas were Oelwein and Maynard where homes were completely swept away from their foundations. Five people were killed while 156 others were injured. Damage was estimated at $21 million. These were two of four F5 tornadoes across the country in 1968, the others being in southeastern Ohio on April 23 and in southwestern Minnesota on June 13. The next  F5 tornadoes in Iowa took place in Jordan in 1976, and in Parkersburg, in 2008.

After the first tornadoes struck the Northern Plains, activity developed further south during the evening hours including several deadly tornadoes in Arkansas. One of the tornadoes touched down west of Jonesboro before hitting the Craighead County city itself at around 10 PM CDT. The tornado caught most residents by surprise since most of the warning systems failed and killed at least 34. One more person was killed in neighboring Jackson County. The tornado was the deadliest in Arkansas since an F4 tornado that affected White County on March 21, 1952 killing 50.

The same city was hit by another destructive tornado five years later killing at least three and injuring 250 others while leaving much more destruction throughout the city than the 1968 event. The damage figures were about $62 million in 1973 dollars. Another F4 tornado just to the west of Jonesboro killed 7 in Oil Trough  in Independence County and 3 others were killed in Baxter County.

The activity ceased across the Deep South when the final tornadoes of the first part of the outbreak touched down across the Metropolitan Memphis area and northern Mississippi as well as in the Fort Wayne, Indiana area. A smaller tornado outbreak from the same system took place across Oklahoma and Texas during the following day where seven tornadoes touched down including an F3 in Wilbarger County, Texas.

In addition to the 45 fatalities in Arkansas and 18 in Iowa, the outbreak killed eight in Illinois and one in Indiana.

Confirmed tornadoes

May 15 event

May 16 event

See also
 List of North American tornadoes and tornado outbreaks

References

External links
 Iowa tornadoes of May 15, 1968 (Courtesy of NWS La Crosse, Wisconsin)

F5 tornadoes
Tornadoes of 1968
Tornadoes in Arkansas
Tornadoes in Illinois
Tornadoes in Indiana
Tornadoes in Iowa
Tornadoes in Kansas
Tornadoes in Missouri
Tornadoes in Minnesota
Tornadoes in Ohio
Tornadoes in Oklahoma
Tornadoes in Tennessee
Tornadoes in Texas
1968 in Arkansas
1968 natural disasters in the United States
May 1968 events in the United States